Kim Ostrenko is an American actress known for her roles in television, film, and theatre.

Early life and education
Kim Ostrenko was born and raised in Miami, Florida, where she lived with her family on a small sailboat on the Miami River until the age of five. Ostrenko graduated from Florida International University with a Bachelor of Fine Arts in theater.

Career 
She has been honored with two Carbonell Awards for Best Supporting Actress and three for Best Ensemble for her theater work. Among her more famous credits in TV and film are: Burn Notice, HBO's From the Earth to the Moon, Boynton Beach Club, Sex Drive and Bachelor Party 2.

Ostrenko has worked with Ashley Judd and Kris Kristofferson (Dolphin Tale), Seth Green (Sex Drive).

Filmography

Film

Television

References

External links
 
 

American people of Ukrainian descent
American film actresses
American stage actresses
American television actresses
Actresses from Miami
Florida International University alumni